Expressways in Guangdong are a major form of transportation in Guangdong province. The network consists of national expressways assigned by National Trunk Highway System in China and provincial expressways assigned by Guangdong Expressway system. Expressways in Guangdong usually need a fare of 0.45 CNY/km (about 0.72 CNY/mile) for a private car due to the provincial standard, while more needed for a larger vehicle.

The first expressway in Guangdong is the Guangfo Expressway, opened in 1989. In 2014, the mileage of expressways in the province exceeded , ranking first in the country. Then it exceeded  in 2015, reaching every county or county-level city in the region. In 2016, the construction plan completed an investment of 85 billion CNY, including 782 km of 15 new projects, 3,583 km of continued construction, and 716 km of 9 projects that were opened to traffic. As of late 2022, the network length exceeded 11,000 kilometers, reaching , ranking first in the country for 9 consecutive years, and the average network density is about 62.39 km/1000 km², also ranking first among the standard provinces in China.

List of routes

National expressways

Provincial expressways

Former routes

References

Transport in Guangdong
Expressways in Guangdong